Craig Lyons (born December 25, 1972) is a Canadian former professional ice hockey and inline hockey player.

Lyons played three seasons (1990–1993) of major junior hockey with the Kamloops Blazers of the Western Hockey League (WHL), helping his team to win the 1992 Memorial Cup.

He went on to play eleven seasons of professional hockey, mostly in the West Coast Hockey League (WCHL) where he suited up for 364 regular season contests. He was named to the WCHL First All-Star Team for the 1996–97, 1997–98 and 2000–01 seasons. During the 2000–01 WCHL season he scored 117 points to lead the WCHL in points, and was selected as the WCHL's Most Valuable Player.

Lyons also played four seasons of professional inline hockey with Roller Hockey International, skating with the Sacramento River Rats, Los Angeles Blades, and San Jose Rhinos between 1995 and 1999.

Lyons, along with Kelly Askew, currently operates 'Shoot 2 Score Hockey' in San Clemente, California.

Awards and honours

References

External links

1972 births
Living people
Canadian ice hockey right wingers
Colorado Gold Kings players
Fresno Falcons players
Guildford Flames players
Kamloops Blazers players
Long Beach Ice Dogs (IHL) players
South Carolina Stingrays players
Springfield Indians players
Utah Grizzlies (IHL) players
Ice hockey people from Calgary
Long Beach Ice Dogs (WCHL) players
Long Beach Ice Dogs (ECHL) players
Los Angeles Blades players
Sacramento River Rats players
San Jose Rhinos players
Canadian expatriate ice hockey players in England
Canadian expatriate ice hockey players in the United States